University Street is a portion of Robert-Bourassa Boulevard in Montreal, Quebec, Canada.

University Street may also refer to:

University Street, Donetsk, Ukraine, a road
University Street station, Seattle, Washington, United States, a transit station
Yliopistonkatu ("University Street")
Yliopistonkatu (Tampere), Tampere, Pirkanmaa, Finland, a street
Yliopistonkatu (Tampere), Turku, Southwest Finland, Finland, a street

See also
 University (disambiguation)
 University Avenue (disambiguation)
 University Square (disambiguation)